Penn Cambria School District is a small, rural, public school district located in Cambria County, Pennsylvania. The district serves the boroughs of Ashville, Cresson, Gallitzin, Lilly, Loretto, Sankertown and Tunnelhill in both Blair County and Cambria County. As well as the townships of Allegheny, Cresson,  Dean, Gallitzin, Munster, and Washington. According to 2000 federal census data, Penn Cambria School District served a resident population of 16,744. By 2010, the district's population increased to 17,359 people. The educational attainment levels for the School District population (25 years old and over) were 88.8% high school graduates and 14.9% college graduates. The district is one of the 500 public school districts of Pennsylvania.

According to the Pennsylvania Budget and Policy Center, 37.2% of the district's pupils lived at 185% or below the Federal Poverty Level   as shown by their eligibility for the federal free or reduced price school meal programs in 2012. In 2009, the district residents’ per capita income was $13,603, while the median family income was $40,432. In the Commonwealth, the median family income was $49,501 and the United States median family income was $49,445, in 2010. In Cambria County, the median household income was $39,574. By 2013, the median household income in the United States rose to $52,100.

School Buildings 
Penn Cambria has five school buildings, each serves a certain number of grade levels:

High school students may choose to attend Admiral Peary Area Vocational Technical School for training in the construction and mechanical trades. The Appalachia Intermediate Unit IU8 provides the district with a wide variety of services like specialized education for disabled students and hearing, background checks for employees, state mandated recognizing and reporting child abuse training, speech and visual disability services and professional development for staff and faculty.

High School Athletics

Boys Sports
 Baseball - Class AA
 Basketball - Class AA
 Cross Country - Class A
 Football - Class AA
 Golf - Class AA
 Track and Field - Class AA
 Wrestling - Class AA

Girls Sports
 Basketball - Class AA
 Cross Country - Class A
 Soccer - Class A
 Softball - Class AA
 Track and Field - Class AA
 Volleyball - Class AA

Middle School Sports:

Boys
Basketball
Football
Wrestling	

Girls
Basketball
Volleyball

According to PIAA directory July 2015

References

External links
Penn Cambria School District official website
Penna. Inter-Scholastic Athletic Assn

School districts in Cambria County, Pennsylvania
School districts established in 1966